Naja Frøkjær-Jensen (born 10 July 2001) is a Danish handball player for Silkeborg-Voel KFUM and the Danish national junior team.

She also represented Denmark in the 2017 European Women's U-17 Handball Championship, 2018 Women's Youth World Handball Championship, and in the 2019 Women's Junior European Handball Championship, placing 6th all three times.

References

2000 births
Living people
People from Rebild Municipality
Danish female handball players
Sportspeople from the North Jutland Region